Lost in Time is a computer adventure game developed and published by Coktel Vision in 1993.  It was promoted as being "The first Interactive Adventure Film using Full Motion Video Technology" and contained four graphical elements: full motion video, hand painted and digitized backgrounds and 3D decor.

Plot 
In 1992, a woman exploring a shipwreck has mysteriously been transported back in time to 1840 when the ship was still intact, she has no choice but to explore.  Her sleuthing leads to revelations about her past.

Release 
The original release in Europe was divided into two parts – that is, two sets of 3.5" Floppy disks sold separately. A CD-ROM version, Lost in Time: Parts 1 & 2, was released at the same time as the floppy version and contained enough storage space for both parts as well as additional and longer video sequences with a higher frame rate and digitized speech. In North America, the game was released on floppy disk and CD-ROM sets as well, but the floppy disk set was not split into separate parts and was released in a single, complete package.

Reception

In April 1994 Computer Gaming World said of Lost in Time on CD that "Though game play is interesting and movement through the 3D world is fluid", the video and music was not as good as in Inca. The magazine concluded that despite some "obtuse" puzzles,
"there's still enough going on to entice those gamers who missed catching reruns of Time Tunnel".

References

External links 
 

1993 video games
Adventure games
Coktel Vision games
DOS games
DOS-only games
First-person adventure games
Full motion video based games
Point-and-click adventure games
ScummVM-supported games
Sierra Entertainment games
Video games about time travel
Video games developed in France
Video games featuring female protagonists